Xavier García may refer to:

 Xavier García (water polo) (born 1984), Spanish water polo player
 Xavier García (footballer) (born 1990), Salvadoran footballer

See also
Javier García (disambiguation)